is a Japanese voice actress affiliated with Mausu Promotion. She is best known for voicing Kanon Mizushiro in Jewelpet Sunshine, Kirari Moroboshi in The Idolmaster Cinderella Girls, Nagahide Niwa in The Ambition of Oda Nobuna, and Yoriko Fujiwara in Tachibanakan To Lie Angle.

Biography

After being separated from her childhood friends during the transition to junior high  school, she decided to make new friends and later met them at the school's anime and manga club. She regained her interest in anime and manga during that time, and later visited an Animate shop. She later entered the broadcasting department, performed readings and announcements, and participated in the NHK Cup's creative radio drama section. After several auditions, Matsuzaki passed the Aniplex presents Super Voice Audition in August 2006 and debuted with Gurren Lagann. Two years later, she joined Mausu Promotion.

In 2015, she was cast as Kirari Moroboshi in The Idolmaster Cinderella Girls, and her character single, which features the song Marshmallow☆Kiss, was released on 8 August 2012. It charted on the Oricon Singles Chart for seven weeks and topped at #10 on 20 August. She subsequently reprised the role in both seasons of the anime adaptation and the Theater spinoff. In other video games, she has voiced Jam Kuradoberi in Guilty Gear Xrd, Mani in The Witch and the Hundred Knight, and Rosa Thunberg in Arcana Heart.

After voicing Catherine in Jewelpet Twinkle, she was later cast as Kanon Mizushiro in Jewelpet Sunshine, and she later voiced a schoolgirl in Jewelpet Happiness and a fairy in Jewelpet: Attack Travel. She has had minor roles in Fate/Zero, Naruto, Nichijou, Okami-san and Her Seven Companions, and Puella Magi Madoka Magica. She also voiced Nao Komatsu in all three episodes of the 2014 OVA adaptation of Futari Ecchi.

Personal life
Matsuzaki is a fan of the Tokyo Yakult Swallows, a professional baseball team in the Central League. She was a columnist for Sankei Sports' edition on the team. She and kabuki actor  IX made an appearance at a Swallows fan meeting in Kabuki-za on 19 February 2019. She hosts Rei & Yui no Bunkahōsō Home Run Radio! (a radio show on Nippon Cultural Broadcasting's  internet radio service) with fellow voice actress Yui Watanabe, who is a fan of the Hanshin Tigers.

On 24 December 2019, Matsuzaki announced her marriage to a male Swallows fan. Matsuzaki said that she and her husband bonded over baseball.

References

1985 births
Living people
Japanese video game actresses
Japanese voice actresses
Mausu Promotion voice actors
Tokyo University of Science alumni
Voice actresses from Fukuoka Prefecture
Voice actors from Fukuoka
21st-century Japanese actresses